Aregon was a painter from Corinth in ancient Greece, who, in conjunction with a "Cleanthes", ornamented the temple of Artemis Alpheionia at the mouth of the Alpheius river in Elis.

Aregon is known to have painted Artemis riding on a griffin.

If Cleanthes was the same artist who was mentioned by Pliny the Elder, Aregon must be placed at the very earliest period of the rise of art in Greece.

Notes

Ancient Corinthians
Ancient Greek painters